Thomas Pearson (March 5, 1859 – July 25, 1939) was a Canadian politician. He served in the Legislative Assembly of British Columbia from 1920 to 1924  from the electoral district of Richmond, a member of the Conservative Party. He previously served as reeve of Point Grey, British Columbia in 1920 and as a councillor from 1916 to 1919.

He married Montreal native Eleanor Pringle on September 20, 1883. She died on September 21, 1930.

He died at his home in Rawdon on July 25, 1939.

References

1859 births
1939 deaths
British Columbia Conservative Party MLAs
People from Lanaudière